A sobriety coin is a token given to Alcoholics Anonymous or other twelve-step program members representing the amount of time the member has remained sober. It is traditionally a medallion the size of a poker chip, 34 mm (1.34 in) (standard) or 39 mm (1.5 in) in diameter. In other twelve-step programs it is to mark time abstaining from whatever the recipient has committed to renounce. There is no official AA medallion or chip; they are used in AA culture but not officially conference-approved, and the AA logo has not been granted for use on medallions.

History 
Alcoholics Anonymous was not the first organization to use sobriety chips: other temperance societies gave medallions to those who swore to stop drinking/using and to track the duration of their sobriety.

First use 
Dr. Bob and the Good Old Timers, the history book for Alcoholics Anonymous, discusses the work of Sister Ignatia in Akron, a nun who was devoted to assisting early members of AA and was known for passing out coins to these members. In this book, it states, "Sister Ignatia gave each of her newly released patients a Sacred Heart Medallion, which she asked them to return before they took the first drink. She would occasionally give out St. Christopher and St. George medals as well."

Use in AA 
The actual history of how the AA chip came about after this is still a mystery. It is believed to have originated in 1942 in Indianapolis. The man who began the Alcoholics Anonymous section in Indianapolis, Doherty S., is thought to have started the sobriety coin tradition within this section of AA.

The Portland group (Maine) began a tradition of using colored poker chips to mark time of sobriety.

As each section of AA saw fit, it joined in on the sobriety coin custom. As private companies saw these coins being used, they began to manufacture “AA” chips (even though they were not affiliated with Alcoholics Anonymous) and sell them to different sections. It is believed that the company that made the modern chip as we know it today occurred in Minneapolis in 1965. Wendells Inc. from Ramsey, Minnesota, began manufacturing the raised center bronze AA Medallion in 1973. The Wendells medallion is the most common bronze coin given by AA members.

Meaning 
When a twelve-step member is presented with their first chip, they are often told, "This chip represents AA's commitment to you – not your commitment to us." Sobriety coins themselves do not necessarily help the holder stay sober, but studies have shown a connection between the visual presence of the coin and the holder's self-resolve. The coins are meant to motivate holders to continue their abstention from the subject of their addiction.

Coin design 

"Alcoholics Anonymous is a fellowship of people who share their experience, strength, and hope with each other that they may solve their common problem and help others to recover from alcoholism." To show how far along each person is in his or her sobriety, most AA groups use a chip of a particular color or alloy that constitutes a range of time that person has been sober. These different-colored chips and values are meant to be tokens of inspiration and a reminder of just how long the member has been sober and how far that member has come. It is evident that "early on, many people in A.A. carried personal mementos to remind themselves of the importance of their sobriety". From personal mementos to coins, the practice of giving out something such as a sobriety chip represents the will and desire that a person has to quit drinking. The practice of giving sobriety chips in AA is attributed to a group in Elmira, New York, in 1947. The celebration of birthdays came from the Oxford group, where members celebrated the anniversary of their spiritual rebirth; in Alcoholics Anonymous, people choose the anniversary of the date of their first full day without a drink. There are fourteen basic coins that are given to members within their first year of sobriety. Generally, coins are given at one month, three months, six months, and nine months of sobriety in the first year. After this, coins are given after each yearly milestone.

Typical coin milestone colors:
 Silver Chip24 hours of sobriety
 Red Chip30 days/1 month of sobriety
 Gold Chip60 days/2 months of sobriety
 Green Chip90 days/3 months of sobriety
 Purple Chip4 months of sobriety
 Pink Chip5 months of sobriety
 Dark Blue Chip6 months of sobriety
 Copper Chip7 months of sobriety
 Red Chip8 months of sobriety
 Purple Chip9 months of sobriety
 Gold Chip10 months of sobriety
 Green Chip11 months of sobriety
 Bronze Chip1 year of sobriety.

"The chip system is optional and not a part of all A.A. groups nationally or worldwide." In 2011, the General Service Office of Alcoholics Anonymous estimated that there were about 58,000 Alcoholic Anonymous groups throughout the United States. All the chips after the one-year chip are traditionally also bronze. There are special novelty chips that come in other metals, colors, types and designs. Common premium sobriety chips are gold- and silver-plated, colored and sometimes coated in a clear epoxy dome.

Notes

References 

 The Anonymous Press. (n.d.) Origin of AA coins, chips, tokens or medallions? Retrieved from anonpress.org
 Alcoholics Anonymous (2012). Frequently asked questions about AA's history. Retrieved from www.aa.org
 Independent Alcoholism Help Council (IAHC). (2012). Relapse prevention and sobriety aids. Retrieved from www.alcoholic.org
 Barefoot's World. (2002). Some history of AA chips. Retrieved from www.barefootsworld.net
 Marijuana Anonymous Online. (2012). MA Online sobriety chips. Retrieved from www.ma-online.org
 General Service Office of Alcoholics Anonymous. (1956/2011). A.A. fact file. Retrieved from www.aa.org/pdf/products/m-24_aafactfile.pdf
 Man, M.E. (2008, July 2). What are the chips that they hand out at the end of an A.A. meeting?
 Christian Recovery Forums. (n.d.). AA glossory. Retrieved from https://web.archive.org/web/20140217221637/http://www.ipass.net/a1idpirat/AAglossary.html
 Meaning Behind Medallions.  RecoveryChip
 How coins started    Passsitonrecoveryshop.com

Alcoholics Anonymous
Token coins
Exonumia